Corks Point Ditch is a  long 2nd order tributary to Smyrna River in New Castle County, Delaware.

Variant names
According to the Geographic Names Information System, it has also been known historically as:  
Beaver Branch
Morris Run

Course
Corks Point Ditch rises the Sawmill Branch divide about 0.25 miles south of Tent in New Castle County, Delaware.  Corks Point Ditch then flows south then northeast to meet the Smyrna River about 2 miles east of Walker, Delaware.

Watershed
Corks Point Ditch drains  of area, receives about 44.4 in/year of precipitation, has a topographic wetness index of 594.01 and is about 13.0% forested.

See also
List of rivers of Delaware

References 

Rivers of Delaware
Rivers of New Castle County, Delaware
Tributaries of the Smyrna River